Shanker village is located in East Ludhiana tehsil in Ludhiana district in the Indian state of Punjab. The village is 13 km from district headquarter Ludhiana. Shankar is also a Gram Panchayat of Shakar village.

Total population of the village 2,799 out of which 1,499 are males and 1,317 are females.

Pin code of this village is 141206.

References 

Villages in Ludhiana East tehsil